Cardiff Central  may refer to:

Politics
Cardiff Central (UK Parliament constituency), constituency in the UK Parliament.
Cardiff Central (Senedd constituency), constituency in the Senedd.
Transport
Cardiff Central railway station
Cardiff Central bus station
Geography
Cardiff City Centre
Buildings
Cardiff Central Library
Central Square, Cardiff